Sandhaven is a small fishing village in Aberdeenshire, Scotland, which lies between Rosehearty to the west and Fraserburgh to the east. It is joined to the even smaller village of Pitullie to the west.

References

Specific

General
Sandhaven in the Gazetteer for Scotland.

Villages in Aberdeenshire